Hans Eidnes (20 March 1887 in Bjarkøy, Troms – 5 June 1962) was a Norwegian politician for the Liberal Party.

He was elected to the Norwegian Parliament from Troms in 1945, but was not re-elected.

Born in Bjarkøy, Eidnes was a member of Trondenes municipality council during the term 1928–1931 and was deputy mayor in 1931–1934.

Outside politics he worked as a school teacher. He was the chairman of Noregs Mållag from 1946 to 1949, and member of Norsk Språknemnd from 1952 to 1959.

References

1887 births
1962 deaths
People from Bjarkøy
Liberal Party (Norway) politicians
Noregs Mållag leaders
Members of the Storting
Troms politicians
Norwegian non-fiction writers
20th-century Norwegian politicians
20th-century non-fiction writers